Muppet Kids is a franchise created by Jim Henson, that ran throughout the 1989 to the 2000s.

Like Muppet Babies, the series featured the young version of the Muppets consisting Kermit, Miss Piggy, Animal, Gonzo, Fozzie, Bean Bunny, Rolf, Janice, Skeeter and Scooter (especially their designs are modeled after Muppet Babies), but appeared as child/pre-teen versions.

Books
Muppet Kids initially produced as a children’s book series from 1989 to 1996, published by Golden Books and Muppet Press.

Film
In 2002, a direct-to-video feature film Kermit's Swamp Years featured the kid version of Kermit.

Muppet Kids Reading and Thinking Series

Muppet Kids Reading and Thinking Series is a series of educational video games based on the Muppet Kids series. It was developed by Jim Henson Interactive, published by Brighter Child, and distributed on some CDs by Encore Software. The games were released in the US, the UK, and France. The games were reissued in 2004 and included video clips from The Muppet Show.

Games
 Volume 1 - Letters: Capital & Small
 Volume 2 - Beginning Sounds: Phonics
 Volume 3 - Sound Patterns: Phonics
 Volume 4 - Thinking Skills
 Volume 5 - Same & Different
 Volume 6 - Sorting & Ordering

Releases
In addition to the individual games on separate CDs, the games were also released as compilations of multiple games on single CDs.
 Muppets (Included in Fun to Learn CD-ROM Five Pack) - Volumes 1 & 2
 Muppet Kids Reading Skills 1 - Volumes 1 to 3
 Muppet Kids Reading Skills 2 - Volumes 4 to 6
 Muppet Kids Kindergarten Deluxe - Volumes 3, 4, & 6
 Jim Henson's Muppet Kids (Ages 3–5) - Volumes 2 to 5
 Muppets Reading Software Activity Kit - Volumes 1 to 6

Others
In 1989, McDonald's produced the series of toys for the Happy Meal line-up, which depicted the Muppet Kids riding on tricycles, for limited time.

References

1997 video games
Children's educational video games
The Muppets video games
Windows games
Classic Mac OS games
Video games about amphibians
Video games about pigs
Video games about bears
Video games about dogs
Video games about rabbits and hares
Video games about children
Video games developed in the United States
American children's books
American picture books
The Muppets books
Franchises
Series of children's books
Children's books adapted into films
English-language books
Books about frogs
Books about pigs
Fiction about monsters
Books about bears
Books about dogs
Books about rabbits and hares
Fictional children
Children's books about friendship
Book series introduced in 1989